The Phone Call is a 2013 British short drama film. It was directed by Mat Kirkby and written by Kirkby and James Lucas. It won the Oscar for Best Live Action Short Film at the 87th Academy Awards.

Plot
The film stars Sally Hawkins as Heather, a crisis hotline counsellor trying to dissuade Stanley (Jim Broadbent), an unseen distraught caller, from a suicide attempt following the death of his wife.

Cast
 Sally Hawkins as Heather
 Jim Broadbent as Stanley
 Edward Hogg as Daniel
 Prunella Scales as Joan

References

External links

 

2013 films
2013 drama films
British drama short films
Films about suicide
Films set in Wales
Live Action Short Film Academy Award winners
Films about telephony
2013 short films
2010s English-language films
2010s British films